"Haw-Haw Land" is the tenth episode of the twenty-ninth season of the American animated television series The Simpsons, and the 628th episode of the series overall. It aired in the United States on Fox on January 7, 2018. The title and the opening musical number spoof La La Land, and the close of the episode spoofs the mistake in announcing that film as the Best Picture winner at the 89th Academy Awards.

Plot
On a rainy day, the Simpson family goes to a STEM conference, where Lisa meets Brendan Beiderbecke (voiced by Ed Sheeran), a boy who is proficient in the piano, and falls in love with him. The bullies are overthrown by Brendan, including Lisa's ex-boyfriend Nelson who tries to impress her musically at Phineas Q. Butterfat's Ice Cream Parlor, starting a conflict in her heart.

Meanwhile, Bart discovers he has an interest in and a talent for chemistry after witnessing chemical reactions. He tries it out on his treehouse with Milhouse where they turn the leaves of the tree into rock candy after Homer and Marge leave. Homer and Marge get worried over Bart, but he seems to be doing good for once, but an accident at school, involving Superintendent Chalmers accidentally drinking a sulfuric acid-laced cup of vodka and losing the tip of his tongue, seems linked to Bart. Bart claims not to know of the incident, but Marge and Homer are unsure.

The family goes to a talent show, where Bart will put on a chemistry demonstration, while Nelson and Brendan perform. Nelson is booed all the way through while Brendan does well. However, he is disqualified for living in West Springfield and is going to be transferred to a school there. After Brendan says goodbye to Lisa, Nelson tells her he is relieved that she didn't choose him, as he needs to focus on his own skills before he can date her. Lisa ends up alone, finding herself enjoying it. As Bart begins his demonstration, the police show up to arrest him for the sulfuric incident. At first conflicted, Marge chooses to believe Bart and assists him in the demonstration, producing a vibrant and safe visual. This proves that Bart is innocent, as Willie admits to spiking the vodka in an attempt to murder Principal Skinner. However, as Marge and Bart reconcile, Bart admits that he built a prank into his demonstration, which explodes and fills the school with pink foam.

In the final scene at the talent show's after-party, while Willie spikes the punch with the Polonium hydride(H2PO), Marge apologizes to the viewers stating that this episode was supposed to parody Moonlight, not La La Land. Homer states that nobody there has seen Moonlight. When Marge offers to show him that movie as they have the DVD, Homer states that he would rather see X-Men: Apocalypse which everyone in the background is interested in seeing, except for Lisa, who'd like to see Moonlight.

Reception
Dennis Perkins of The A.V. Club gave this episode a C+, stating, "Pegging an episode of The Simpsons directly to a specific pop cultural target requires a whole lot more imagination to pull off than ‘Haw-Haw Land’ can muster. The title, bringing in Nelson’s catchphrase, is at the top of the cleverness heap here, seeing as how the school bully and one-time Lisa Simpson paramour forms one point in the episode’s La La Land love triangle. But if you’re going to do a parody of a lavish Hollywood musical love story (and, as the episode tag jokes, accidental momentary Oscar winner), you have to bring a lot more to the enterprise than is on display."

"Haw-Haw Land" was watched by 6.95 million viewers with a 2.8 rating and a 9 share, making it Fox's highest-rated show of the night.

References

External links
 

2018 American television episodes
The Simpsons (season 29) episodes